Hugh Ronald Alexander Millikin (born 4 July 1957 in North Vancouver, British Columbia) is an Australian curler originally from Ottawa, Ontario.

Career
In 1986, while still residing in the Canadian province of Ontario, Millikin played second position for Dave Van Dine's Canadian Mixed Curling Championship team.

Millikin would later move to Australia and has skipped the Australian team to nine Pacific Curling Championships titles. Millikin has also participated in 11 World Curling Championships. The team's top placements have been sixth place in 1992, 1993 and 2008. Millikin also went to the 1992 Winter Olympics, skipping the Australian team to a seventh-place finish in the demonstration event.

Millikin and his team used travel back to his hometown Ottawa to practice and to participate in local curling tournaments. Their team coach was Earle Morris, father of John Morris.

At the 2008 World Men's Curling Championship, he skipped Australia to a 5–6 record, the most wins ever for Australia. The team came an end short from forcing a tie-breaker.

The Australian team missed qualification for the 2010 Winter Olympics by 0.5 points, finishing ranked 11th in the world, with only the top ten qualifying for the games.

Current team mates
Millikin has skipped the Senior Australian team in the past, last participating in the 2018 World Senior Curling Championships in Ostersund, Sweden, finishing 5th. His teammates were:

 Lead: Tim McMahon
 Second: Steve Johns
 Third:  Geoff Davis
 Alternate: John Anderson

Awards
Colin Campbell Award - 1993
Australian Sports Medal - 2000

References

External links
 

1957 births
Living people
Australian male curlers
Curlers from British Columbia
Canadian male curlers
Canadian mixed curling champions
People from North Vancouver
Curlers from Ottawa
Curlers at the 1992 Winter Olympics
Pacific-Asian curling champions
Canadian emigrants to Australia
Olympic curlers of Australia